The Boyfriends were an English indie four-piece musical group from London, England, who consisted of Martin Wallace on vocals, Richard Adderley on guitar, David Barnett on bass and Paddy Pulzer on drums. Adderley and Pulzer had previous played together in Jack. They received press coverage in The Guardian The Independent and the NME which claimed the band was Morrissey's favourite new band.

Career
The band released a split single on 9 August 2004 with The Long Blondes. Boobytrap Records (of Cardiff) saw them playing to a sparse crowd at Glastonbury Festival and offered the band a deal. Their debut single "I Love You" was released in 2005 and they rose to prominence when the NME listed them in the Top 50 essential bands to see. In June, they were the first band ever to play the newly christened John Peel Stage at that year's Glastonbury Festival and had been likened to The Smiths by the British press. This drew interest from Morrissey who, after going to one of their shows, was supposedly so impressed he offered them the supporting slot on his 2006 European tour on the spot.

Two more singles followed in 2006 along with an eponymous album released in October, but The Boyfriends split soon after, following a tour in support of The Divine Comedy. By 2007 their label, Boobytrap Records, had collapsed and the band's website no longer exists. Boobytrap Records boss, Geraint John, implied that the band had split due to poor management in an interview with Playlouder.

Since the split, Adderley, Barnett and Pulzer have also been working on music together. Barnett formed a supergroup of sorts under the name The New Royal Family (featuring Adderley on bass, and present and former members of Gay Dad, Luxembourg, Scarlet's Well and Salad, amongst others). Their song "Anyone Fancy A Chocolate Digestive?" was adopted by podcasts for two football teams, the Vancouver White Caps and East Fife FC.  Barnett also joined Luxembourg. Adderley has acted as producer for both bands.

Discography

Studio albums
 The Boyfriends (2 October 2006, Boobytrap Records)

Singles

References

External links 
 Official Myspace
 The New Royal Family (featuring David Barnett and Richard Adderley)
 Small Crew (featuring Richard Adderley)
 NME.com page - archive of Boyfriends news and coverage
 Drownedinsound.com page - online coverage

English indie rock groups
Musical groups disestablished in 2006
Musical groups established in 2003